Tympanocryptis fortescuensis is a species of agama found in the Pilbara region of Western Australia.

References

fortescuensis
Agamid lizards of Australia
Taxa named by Paul Doughty
Taxa named by Luke Kealley
Taxa named by Jane Melville
Reptiles described in 2015